The Port Mayaca Lock is a navigable lock and dam on the Okeechobee Waterway (St. Lucie Canal), adjacent to U.S. Route 441 and U.S. Route 98 at Canal Point, in Martin County, Florida, United States.

It is located near Port Mayaca at latitude 26° 59" 5', longitude -80° 37" 5'.

Port Mayaca Lock is open daily from 7:00am to 5:00pm. New Lock hour as of 1 April 2015.

The total cost of construction was  $13.1 million.

Purpose
This structure was created to help raise the water level in the lake, for the purpose of retaining fresh water for agricultural use, city water supply, and for navigation. It also serves for regulating flood control water into the Everglades during hurricane season.

Technical information

The lock gates are "sector gates" (pie-slice shaped), and are made of steel. The spillway is ogee-type concrete, with 4 vertical lift gates.

Radio channel
This lock operates on Marine VHF radio channel 13.

Gallery

See also
List of reservoirs and dams in Florida

References

External links
American Canal Society Report

Dams in Florida
United States Army Corps of Engineers dams
Transport infrastructure completed in 1977
Dams completed in 1977
1977 establishments in Florida
Locks of Florida